Hobnobs (sometimes stylized as HobNobs) is the brand name of a commercial biscuit. They are made from rolled oats, are similar to a flapjack-digestive biscuit hybrid, and are among the most popular British and Irish biscuits. McVitie's launched Hobnobs in 1985 and a milk chocolate variant in 1987. The plain variety is manufactured at Tollcross factory in Glasgow, and the chocolate variety is made at the Harlesden factory in north-west London.

They are primarily sold in the United Kingdom, the Isle of Man and Ireland but are available in Australia, New Zealand, South Africa and several European and Asian countries (e.g. Taiwan, China, and Hong Kong). In Italy they are now marketed as a variety of digestive biscuits, having previously been known as Suncrok. They were also released in Canada in November 2012, made available in Wal-Mart's British modular section in their food aisles. The McVitie's Hobnob is the third-most-popular biscuit in the UK to "dunk" into tea, with its chocolate variant sixth. In 2014 a UK survey declared the Chocolate Hobnob the nation's favourite biscuit.

History

The commercial recipe for Hobnob biscuits was introduced by McVitie's in the UK in 1985. A best seller, demand for the plain Hobnobs led to the introduction of a chocolate variant in 1987. The biscuit is currently available in many varieties, including dark chocolate, chocolate orange, and Hobnob bars. Other Hobnobs-branded snacks include a Hobnobs flapjack. Hobnobs contains approx 0.16 g of sodium per biscuit.

The name Hobnob comes from the verb 'to hobnob', which means to spend time being friendly with someone who is important or famous. Channel 4's Secret World of Biscuits programme claims that the name comes from the two words "hob" (suggesting home-cooked on a stove) and "knobbly" referencing the texture.

Manufacture
Plain Hobnobs are made at the Tollcross factory in Glasgow. The chocolate variety is made at the Harlesden factory in north-west London. The basic ingredients for Hobnobs are oats.

Marketing
The original tagline of the Hobnobs was "one nibble and you're nobbled", and was removed. It has since been brought back, but slightly changed by adding "hob" to the beginning of the last word.

The tagline "Chocolate now has Hobnobs underneath" was used for the introduction in the UK of chocolate Hobnobs.

References

External links
 Milk Chocolate and Orange Hobnobs on Nice Cup of Tea and a Sit Down
 "Sheldon" webcomic, 13 February 2006

Biscuit brands
Food brands of the United Kingdom
Products introduced in 1985
United Biscuits brands
Oat-based dishes